Gibbs Cancer Center & Research Institute (Gibbs Cancer Center, Gibbs) is a cancer treatment and research facility in Upstate South Carolina. Gibbs Cancer Center is associated with the NCI Community Cancer Centers Program and the Medical University of South Carolina. Gibbs headquarters is located on the campus of the Spartanburg Medical Center (SRMC) in Spartanburg, SC.

Overview 
Gibbs Cancer Center is the home of multiple established oncology groups:
 Medical Group of the Carolinas - Hematology Oncology
 Medical Group of the Carolinas - Surgical Oncology
 Medical Group of the Carolinas - Gynecology Oncology
 Medical Group of the Carolinas - Radiation Oncology
 Bearden-Josey Center for Breast Health
In addition, Gibbs Cancer Center has ten multidisciplinary treatment programs for each of the specific types of cancer (Breast, Cutaneous, Gastrointestinal, Genitourinary, Gynecologic, Endocrine, Head and Neck, Hematologic, Neural and Thoracic). Selected by the National Cancer Institute (NCI) to participate in the Community Clinical Oncology Program, Gibbs is the only NCI Community Cancer Centers Program (NCCCP) in the Carolinas.

Gibbs has professional patient navigators. A navigator is a specially trained registered nurse, often with advanced degrees and certifications, plus years of experience in cancer care, who is the continuous point of contact for the patient and their family throughout their cancer diagnosis, treatment and survival planning. Gibbs Cancer Center established its navigator program in 1998.

Gibbs Cancer is one of 12 community cancer centers to earn the Association of Community Cancer Centers’ 2011 Innovator Awards, in recognition of survivorship program. Gibbs has received Magnet certification from the American Nurses Credentialing Center (ANCC). Gibbs was named the first Hospital of the Future by the U.S. Department of Defense. In 2013, the medical oncology practice (Medical Group of the Carolinas – Hematology Oncology) won Gibbs another ACCC Innovator Award, this time for the integration of palliative care information.

History 
Dr. John Fleming established the Spartanburg Cancer Clinic in 1934, and the clinic received national accreditation in 1938. Drs. Jay Bearden and Julian Josey initiated the concept of the current cancer center in 1976 by convincing administrators at Spartanburg Regional Hospital to allow them to consolidate all existing cancer treatment and support services into a dedicated, single-floor unit, a coordinated-services approach that was virtually unheard of at the time. Bearden started the hosting of clinical trials in 1976, through collaboration with Wake Forest University.

Gibbs Cancer Center, which opened its doors in 1999, was named for Jimmy and Marsha Gibbs, who had donated a $1.2 million lead gift toward establishing the center.

Gibbs was selected to be an NCI-funded clinical oncology programs in 1983 and has been continuously funded by NCI for thirty years. Gibbs Cancer Center became an exclusive host affiliate of the MD Anderson Cancer Center in 2005, and established the Bearden-Josey Center for Breast Health in 2008. The Center collaborated with the Edward Via College of Osteopathic Medicine to build a 7,500 square foot Clinical Oncology Laboratory in order to conduct research in the fields of personalized cancer treatment, colorectal cancer treatment, cancer stem cells and regenerative medicine.

Gibbs Cancer Center opened a location in Gaffney, SC in 2011. In addition, a brand-new Gibbs Cancer Center & Research Institute of Pelham location was opened in 2013 in Greer, SC, on the same campus as Pelham Medical Center.

Leadership 
Gibbs Cancer Center & Research Institute operates under the direction of professionals who are charged with maintaining and advancing its mission and effectiveness:
 Timothy J. Yeatman, M.D., FACS, Director of Gibbs Cancer Center and President of Gibbs Research Institute
 James D. Bearden III, M.D., FACP - Vice President, Clinical Research & Physician Manager
 Julian C. Josey, Jr., M.D., Director of Bearden – Josey Center for Breast Health
 Warren Jack Pledger, PhD, Associate Director for Research and Deputy Director of Gibbs Research Institute
 David Church, MBA, PhD - Vice President, Oncology & Support Services

Cancer Care Committee 
The Cancer Care Committee is a multidisciplinary group of clinicians that supervises quality standards at Gibbs Cancer Center, including compliance with certification criteria, participation in continuing staff education, and review and development of new patient care practices.

Research 
Research begins with clinical trials. Gibbs Cancer Center & Research Institute has more than 140 clinical trials underway at any time through the Upstate Carolina-Community Clinical Oncology Program (CCOP) at Gibbs. Gibbs Cancer & Research Institute has two dozen specially trained research nurses and more than twenty support staff members as well as doctors, technicians, social workers and other specialized medical professionals to monitor patients’ health before, during and after studies.

Dr. Timothy Yeatman became the Director of Gibbs Cancer Center and President of Gibbs Research Institute Center in 2012, bringing the NIH- and pharmaceutical industry-funded research program he had assembled at the H. Lee Moffitt Cancer Center & Research Institute to Gibbs. Jack Pledger, PhD., also joined Gibbs Research Institute as the Associate Director for Research and Deputy Director of Gibbs Research Institute. In April 2013, Gibbs Cancer Center & Research Institute finished building its $2 million, 7,500-square-foot cancer research lab. They have also built a collaborative partnership with the Edward Via College of Osteopathic Medicine (VCOM).

Affiliations 
Gibbs Cancer Center & Research Institute is affiliated with and collaborates with research centers all over the country, including:

 ALLIANCE - (North Central Cancer Treatment Group, American College of Surgeons Oncology Group, Cancer and Leukemia Group B) 
 NRG - (National Surgical Adjuvant Breast and Bowel Project, Gynecologic Oncology Group, Radiation Therapy Oncology Group)
 Academic & Community Cancer Research United (formerly Mayo Clinic Cancer Research Consortium) 
 Clinical Trials Support Unit 
 Comprehensive Cancer Center at Wake Forest University 
 Duke University 
 Eastern Cooperative Oncology Group 
 H. Lee Moffitt Cancer Center 
 Medical University of South Carolina 
 National Cancer Institute of Canada 
 National Surgical Adjuvant Breast and Bowel Project Foundation (FRP) 
 NCI Community Cancer Centers Program 
 Sarah Cannon Research Institute at Vanderbilt University 
 Southwest Oncology Group 
 SunCoast CCOP Research Base at the University of South Florida 
 University of North Carolina-Chapel Hill Lineberger Comprehensive Cancer Center 
 University of Rochester Cancer Center

References

Medical and health organizations based in South Carolina
Companies based in Spartanburg, South Carolina